You and Your Sister is the debut album by the American band the Vulgar Boatmen, released in 1989. The Vulgar Boatmen, at the time of the album, constituted two bands: one based in Florida and one based in Indiana.

Production
The album's songs were written by Dale Lawrence and Robert Ray. Ray, based in Florida, and Lawrence, based in Indiana, sent songs through the mail. Aside from a few tracks recorded in Indiana, the majority of the album was made at Ray's Gainesville, Florida, home studio. You and Your Sister was coproduced by Ray and Walter Salas-Humara.

Critical reception

Robert Christgau wrote: "These guys make much more than you expect out of what first sounds like almost nothing--just tuneful enough to warrant play two, their mild jangle gains sweetness and kick as your faith increases." The Chicago Tribune thought that "all of it—even the rhythmically powerful songs—is somehow quiet; it`s the dreamy, heart-tugging stuff that drifts in from another room late at night." Greil Marcus, in The Village Voice, called the songs "very '50s in their casualness, present-day in their insistence on doubt."

AllMusic wrote that "a dozen near-perfect roots pop tunes ... address simple concerns, like driving and changing the world all around, to a steady four-four beat that just about accomplishes that latter feat with only the occasional syncopated accent." The New Yorker thought that "the sound in general was what you’d call 'organic'—you could basically hear the guitars being strummed, the drums occasionally snapped, the almost-resigned naturalness of the lead singer’s voice, the plaintiveness of the melodies."

Track listing

References

1989 debut albums